Belmont House may refer to:

 Belmont House, Toronto, care home in Canada
 Belmont House, Shetland, lairds house in Scotland
 Belmont House (Montevideo), hotel in Uruguay
 Belmont House, Herefordshire, country house in Herefordshire, England
 Belmont House and Gardens, country house in Kent, England
 Belmont House School, Newton Mearns, Scotland
 Belmont Manor House, Virginia, USA
 Belmont Hall, Cheshire, Cheshire, England
 Perry Belmont House, historic name for the International Temple, Washington, D.C.
 Belmont-Paul Women's Equality National Monument in Washington, D.C.
 Mrs. O. H. P. Belmont House, New York City

See also
 Belmont Mansion (disambiguation)